The Rason Special Economic Zone, earlier called the Rajin-Sonbong Economic Special Zone, was established in the early 1990s by the North Korean government near Rason to promote economic growth through foreign investment. It is similar to the Special Economic Zones set up by the People's Republic of China and elsewhere to pilot market economics in a designated controlled area. It is near the border with China and Russia and is a warm-water port for both countries.

Chinese and Russian companies have invested in the economic zone. Mongolia has joined recently, and the use of foreign currency is permitted. Bloomberg reported that ground was broken in June 2011 on a further development stage of the zone. In November 2011, work began on building electricity transmission lines that will provide Chinese electricity supplies in the zone.

Administration
The Rason Special Economic Zone is administered by the Committee for Promotion of External Economic Cooperation (CPEEC). Foreign companies must be invited by the CPEEC to participate in the special zone.

The first joint North-South company, called Chilbosanmeri Joint Company, has been formally established in Rason Special Economic Zone.

Sources conflict over the date the zone was founded, either 1991 or 1993.  Since its creation, laws governing the zone's status have been amended six times, the most recent revision being approved by the Presidium of the Supreme People's Assembly on 3 December 2011.

When Jang Sung-taek was purged in late 2013, the accusations against him included the charge that he had "made no scruple of committing such act of treachery in May last as selling off the land of the Rason economic and trade zone to a foreign country."

Geography

The 746 km2 Rason Special Economic Zone is on the western side of the Tumen River in North Korea. It is between 42 08'-42 38'N and 130 07'-130 42'E. This location is in the easternmost end of the country, bordering Russia and China.

Economy
In 1996, 51 foreign businesses invested USD $37.3259 million into the Rason Zone. The UNIDO estimates the investment will increase to $150 million in the future.

In August 2012, an international trade fair was held, offering foreign investors and journalists a look at the work-in-progress. The zone is slated to be a manufacturing, tourism, and transportation hub. However, some analysts think the special zone is more of a project for North Korea to experiment with the capitalist economy rather than use it as basis of transforming North Korea's economy.

Foreign investments
Pipa Tourist Hotel
Ra-Son Economic Co-operation Company
Foreign Economic Co-operation Corporation
Korea Joint Venture Group
Samgwang Trading Company
Korea Machinery Trading Company
Korea Daesong B Trading Corporation
Opalsam Trading Company
Korea Rungra 888 Trading Corporation
Korea Ponghwa General Corporation
Pyongyang Aluminium Products Factory
Korea Osoksan Trading Company
Light Industry Products Trading Company
Korea Samtaesong General Group
Korea Pyongchon Trading Corporation
Golden Triangle Bank
Yanbian Tianyu International Trade Company

History of foreign business legislation

From 1993 to 2012, there was one single law titled ‘Law of the Democratic People’s Republic of Korea on the Rason Economic and Trade Zone’, which did not mention specific details of business environment, leaving foreign investors with many questions. The first Rason SEZ Law launched in 1993 contained chapters of Fundamentals, Duties and Rights of Operation Committee, Guarantee of Economy Activities, Customs Duties, Currency and Finance, Guarantee and Preferential Treatment and Settlement of Disputes. The basic framework was continued until 2011, when it made modifications on Development and Management of the Zone, Establishment of Enterprises, Economic and Trade Activities and Incentives and Preferential Treatment, providing more details of the environment for foreign-invested companies. However it still did not cover all basically required details for foreign-invest companies such as regulations of labor, tax, or financial management.

From 2014 on, NK started to acknowledge the necessity of a more complex and comprehensive legal framework. North Korea adopted more specific regulations regarding certain legal fields such as Labor Regulations for Foreign-invested Businesses and Regulations of Financial Management of Foreign-invested Businesses. Furthermore, bylaws for Taxation and Establishment and Operation of Businesses appeared. According to the latest Rason SEZ law published in 2016, there are total 16 regulations included in the collection of laws, with at least 3 additional regulations enacted.

In October 2013 and May 2014, international conferences on special economic zones took place, and the concept of many provincial economic zones was considered. However from 2019 these possibilities have diminished, partly out of a concern of excessive foreign influence on North Korean society.

Transport
Chinese investors have renovated a road from Rason to China, and Russian railway workers have renovated the railway from Rason (which is on the Pyongra Line) to Russia, from where it continues onto the Trans-Siberian Railway.

There are three ports in the area: the Rajin Port (handling capacity of 3 million tons), the Sonbong Port (handling capacity of 2-3 million tons), and the Chongjin Port (handling capacity of 8 million tons).

Chinese companies operate two piers at the Rajin Port for coal export and containers. A Russian company operates a third pier.

See also

 Kaesŏng Industrial Region
 Special economic zone
 Economy of North Korea

References

External links
 Rason Economic and Trade Zone at Naenara
 Report on Rason Special Economic Zone, Democratic People’s Republic of Korea, Andray Abrahamian, September 2011, Choson Exchange
 Rajin-Sonbong Economic & Trade Zone: Investment & Business Guide, United Nations Industrial Development Organization, 1998
 Information on Entry & Investment into Rajin-Sonbong District, 1997
 Rason International Economic Zone

Economy of North Korea
Special economic zones
Rason
1992 establishments in North Korea